Oreonesion is a monotypic genus of flowering plants belonging to the family Gentianaceae. The only species is Oreonesion testui.

Its native range is Western Central Tropical Africa.

References

Gentianaceae
Gentianaceae genera
Monotypic Gentianales genera